Perec is a surname of several French people, including:
Georges Perec, (1936–1982), French novelist of Polish-Jewish origin (the surname is the Polish spelling of the Biblical Hebrew name Peretz)
Marie-José Pérec, (born 1968), French athlete

See also
Peretz